The 1945 college football season was the 77th season of intercollegiate football in the United States.  Competition included schools from the Big Ten Conference, the Pacific Coast Conference (PCC), the Southeastern Conference (SEC), the Big Six Conference, the Southern Conference, the Southwestern Conference, and numerous smaller conferences and independent programs. The season followed the end of World War II in August 1945, though many college players remained in military service.

The teams ranked highest in the final Associated Press poll in December 1945 were: 

The year's statistical leaders included halfback Bob Fenimore of Oklahoma A&M with 1,641 yards of total offense and 1,048 rushing yards, quarterback Al Dekdebrun of Cornell with 1,227 passing yards, and end Reid Moseley of Georgia with 662 receiving yards.

Conference and program changes

Season timeline

September
The Associated Press did not poll the writers until the third week of the season.  Among the teams that had been ranked in the top six at the end of 1944, only the two service academies (Army and Navy) as well as Ohio State, were still playing a regular schedule.  Among the service teams that had ranked high in 1944, Randolph Field, 
Bainbridge Naval, and Iowa Pre-Flight no longer played against college teams.  Some service teams still remained in place, even after the end of World War II.

On September 15, Michigan beat Great Lakes Navy, 27–2.  On September 22, Michigan lost to Indiana, 13–7.  Minnesota beat Missouri, 34–0.  In a Friday night game in Los Angeles, USC beat UCLA 13–6.  September 29 Notre Dame beat Illinois 7–0, Army beat Louisville Field, 32–0, and Navy beat Villanova 49–0.  USC won at California, 13–2, and Ohio State won at Missouri 47–6.

October
On October 6, Army beat Wake Forest, 54–0 and Navy beat Duke, 21–0.  Ohio State beat Iowa 42–0.  Minnesota won at Nebraska 61–7.  Notre Dame won at Georgia Tech, 40–7.  UCLA beat St. Mary's Pre-Flight, 26–14. The year's first AP Poll was led by No. 1 Army, No. 2 Navy, No. 3 Notre Dame, No. 4 Ohio State, and No. 5 Minnesota.

October 13 At Yankee Stadium in New York, No. 1 Army beat No. 9 Michigan, 28–7.  No. 2 Navy stayed unscored upon with a 28–0 win over Penn State.  No. 3 Notre Dame beat Dartmouth, 34–0.  No. 4 Ohio State beat Wisconsin, 12–0.  No. 5 Minnesota beat Fort Warren, 14–0. The top five in the AP Poll remained the same.

October 20  No. 1 Army beat Melville PT Boats 55–13.
In Baltimore, No. 2 Navy beat Georgia Tech 20–6.  No. 3 Notre Dame won at Pittsburgh, 39–9.  No. 4 Ohio State lost to No. 9 Purdue, 35–13.  No. 5 Minnesota defeated Northwestern, 30–7. The new top five was No. 1 Army, No. 2 Notre Dame, No. 3 Navy, No. 4 Purdue, and No. 5 Minnesota.

October 27 In New York, No. 1 Army beat No. 19 Duke 48–13.  No. 2 Notre Dame beat Iowa 56–0.  In Philadelphia, No. 3 Navy defeated No. 7 Penn, 14–7.  No. 4 Purdue lost to unranked Northwestern, 26–14.  No. 5 Minnesota lost to No. 12 Ohio State, 20–7.  In Birmingham, No. 6 Alabama beat Georgia 28–14.  No. 8 Indiana beat No. 14 Tulsa 7–2, to reach 5–0–1 and the No. 5 ranking behind Army, Notre Dame, Navy, and Alabama.

November

November 3  No. 1 Army beat Villanova, 54–0.  No. 2 Notre Dame and No. 3 Navy, both 5–0–0, met in Cleveland, and played to a 6–6 tie.  In Louisville, No. 4 Alabama defeated Kentucky, 60–19.  No. 5 Indiana beat Cornell College of Iowa, 46–6, but dropped to sixth in the next poll.  In Los Angeles, No. 8 St. Mary's beat No. 6 USC 26–0 and moved up to fifth place behind Army, Notre Dame, Alabama, and Navy.

November 10  No. 1 Army (6–0–0)  and No. 2 Notre Dame (5–0–1) met for a showdown at Yankee Stadium, and it was no contest, with the Cadets winning 48–0.  No. 3 Alabama was idle.  In Baltimore, No. 4 Navy beat No. 7 Michigan 33–7.  No. 5 St. Mary's beat Fresno State, 32–6.  No. 6 Indiana won at No. 20 Minnesota, 49–0. The next poll was No. 1 Army, No. 2 Navy, No. 3 Alabama, No. 4 Indiana, and No. 5 St. Mary's.

November 17  In Philadelphia, No. 1 Army beat No. 6 Penn, 61–0.
No. 2 Navy defeated Wisconsin 36–7 in Baltimore.  In Nashville, No. 3 Alabama beat Vanderbilt, 71–0.  No. 4 Indiana won at Pittsburgh, 19–0.  No. 5 St. Mary's lost to UCLA, 13–7.  No. 7 Notre Dame won at Northwestern 34–7 and moved back up to No. 5, with the top four remaining the same.

November 24 No. 1 Army (8–0–0) and No. 2 Navy (7–0–1), both unbeaten, were idle as they prepared for the Army–Navy Game.  No. 3 Alabama beat the Pensacola Naval Air Station, 55–6.  No. 4 Indiana closed its season at 9–0–1 with a 26–0 win over No. 18 Purdue.  In New Orleans, No. 5 Notre Dame beat Tulane, 32–6. The top five remained the same.

December
December 1  In the second No. 1 and No. 2 matchup of the year, No. 1 Army (8–0–0) and No. 2 Navy (7–0–1) met at the Army–Navy Game in Philadelphia, with Army winning 32–13 to close a perfect season and a wire-to-wire No. 1 ranking.  No. 3 Alabama defeated Mississippi State 55–13 and moved to No. 2 in the final poll with Navy falling to No. 3.  Indiana had finished its season and remained at No. 4.  No. 5 Notre Dame lost to the Great Lakes Navy team, 39–7.  No. 6 Oklahoma A&M, which had finished the season 9–0–0 and accepted an invitation to the Sugar Bowl, rose to fifth in the final poll.

Bowl games

Conference standings

Major conference standings

Independents

Minor conferences

Minor conference standings

Rankings

Awards and honors

Heisman Trophy voting
The Heisman Trophy is given to the year's most outstanding player

All-America team

Statistical leaders

Team leaders

Total offense

Total defense

Rushing offense

Rushing defense

Passing offense

Individual leaders

Total offense

Rushing

Passing

Receiving

See also
 1945 College Football All-America Team

References